Victoria Alekseyevna Tyumneva, née Baranova (born 6 February 1990) is a Russian track cyclist. At the 2012 Summer Olympics, cycling's governing body, the UCI, confirmed that Baranova tested positive for a prohibited substance and was sent home from the Games.

Results
2009
3rd Team Sprint, UCI World Track Cup, Cali
2010
3rd Team Sprint, UEC European U23 Track Championships (with Anastasia Voynova)
2011
3rd Sprint, UCI World Track Cup, Cali
3rd Team Sprint, UCI World Track Cup, Cali
3rd Sprint, UEC European Track Championships
UEC European U23 Track Championships
1st Keirin
1st Sprint
3rd 550m Time Trial
2012
UEC European U23 Track Championships
1st Keirin
1st Sprint
1st Team Sprint (with Anastasia Voynova)
2014
Grand Prix Minsk
2nd Keirin
2nd Sprint
2nd Sprint, Grand Prix of Russian Helicopters

References

1990 births
Russian female cyclists
Russian sportspeople in doping cases
Living people
Doping cases in cycling
Russian track cyclists
People from Zhukovsky, Moscow Oblast
Universiade medalists in cycling
Universiade silver medalists for Russia
Universiade bronze medalists for Russia
Medalists at the 2011 Summer Universiade
Sportspeople from Moscow Oblast